Alphonse du Congé (or Ducongé) Dubreuil (19 June 1734 – 22 February 1801) was an 18th-century French poet and playwright.

In 1777, he wrote an opera libretto on the theme of Iphigénie en Tauride, which he proposed to Christoph Willibald Gluck but the text was eventually set in music by Niccolò Piccinni.

Works 
1776: La Pucelle de Paris, poème en douze chants
1781: Iphigénie en Tauride, opera, music by Niccolò Piccinni, premiered at Academy Royale de musique 23 January
1790: L'Amant travesti ou les Muletiers, two-act opéra bouffon, after Jean de La Fontaine, music by Marc-Antoine Désaugiers, premiered in Paris,  Théâtre de Monsieur, 2 November
1794: Paul et Virginie ou le Triomphe de la vertu, three-act drame lyrique, after Jacques-Henri Bernardin de Saint-Pierre, music by Jean-François Lesueur, premiere at Academy Royale de musique 13 January

External links 
 Alphonse Dubreuil on CÉSAR
 Alphonse Dubreuil on Data.bnf.fr

1734 births
1801 deaths
18th-century French dramatists and playwrights
18th-century French poets
18th-century French male writers
French opera librettists